The Delay In The Universal Loop is the stage name of Dylan Iuliano, an Italian-based electronic musician originally from San Nazzaro (Campania), a small municipality in the province of Benevento, Italy.
His music has been described as a blend of abstract psychedelia, noise, electronica, new wave, dance and alternative rock.

The Delay In The Universal Loop's first full-length album Disarmonia was released in December 2013 via Factum Est and reissued in the United States by Dilated Time Records

After releasing  his debut album, Iuliano left high school to tour extensively through Europe and North America in 2014.
As he set off on his second North American tour, he debuted "Texan Daylight" via CMJ as the first single off his sophomore full length, Split Consciousness.

Split Consciousness was released on July 7, 2015 via Moon Sounds Records and Dilated Time, it was premiered on Noisey.

On July 10, 2020, Iuliano teamed up with Bulbless! Records and Bell Garden Records to release Holy Circuitry.

Discography
Albums
Disarmonia (Factum Est/Jestrai Records, December 2013) 
Disarmonia (US Reissue) (Dilated Time Records, March 2014)
Split Consciousness (Moon Sounds Records/Dilated Time Records, July 2015)
Holy Circuitry (Bulbless! Records/Bell Garden Records, July 2020)

EPs
Nei Nostri Eterni Ritorni EP (November 2012)

References

External links

 The Delay In The Universal Loop discography at Discogs.

Italian musicians
Italian electronic musicians
Living people
People from the Province of Benevento
Year of birth missing (living people)